The Chalypso was a popular dance from 1958 which arose from the Calypso Craze of 1957 and combined the sounds and feel of the cha-cha-cha and calypso.  It was developed and popularized by dancers on  American Bandstand.  It is among the dances listed in "At the Hop" by Danny and the Juniors.

A favorite song for chalypso was  Billy and Lillie’s "La De Dah", which had been released on Bandstand host Dick Clark's Swan Records.  Many artists recorded chalypso songs, including Ike Turner and Chubby Checker.  The craze was supplanted by Checker's version of "The Twist".

External references
  Chalypso
 Dance description as taught by Richard Powers in 2007 at Stockton Folk Dance Camp

Novelty and fad dances
Dance in the United States